One Summer Again is a 1985 Australian docudrama miniseries about the painter Tom Roberts and the Heidelberg School art movement. Set in and around the city of Melbourne in the late 19th century, the film traces Roberts' career and his relationships with other members of the Heidelberg School, including Arthur Streeton, Charles Conder and Frederick McCubbin. Their artists' camps are recreated in authentic bush settings, which one critic described as having "the soft warmth of a McCubbin painting". Film sets true to the period are contrasted with shots of contemporary Melbourne.

The title comes from a letter Conder sent to Roberts, longing for the time they spent painting together at Heidelberg: "Give me one summer again, with yourself and Streeton, the same long evenings, songs, dirty plates, and last pink skies. But these things don't happen, do they? And what's gone is over."

Cast
John Wood
Michele Fawdon
John Lee
Joan Sydney
Nina Landis

References

External links
One Summer Again at IMDb

1980s Australian television miniseries
1985 Australian television series debuts
1985 Australian television series endings
1985 television films
1985 films
English-language television shows
Heidelberg School